Dametir-e Jonubi (also Romanized as Dametīr-e Jonūbī) is a village in Mehregan Rural District, in the Central District of Parsian County, Hormozgan Province, Iran. At the 2006 census, its population was 351, in 75 families.

References 

Populated places in Parsian County